Anna Strunsky Walling (March 21, 1877 – February 25, 1964) was known as an early 20th-century Jewish-American author and advocate of socialism based in San Francisco, California, and New York City. She was primarily a novelist, but also wrote about social problems and the labor movement. Born in the Russian Empire in what is now Belarus, she emigrated as a child with her family to New York City in the United States in 1886. After a few years they moved to San Francisco. Strunsky studied at Stanford University, where she met writer Jack London and later became part of a radical group known as "The Crowd", of which London was also a member. They wrote an epistolary novel together, publishing it anonymously in 1903. She wrote a memoir of him after his early death in 1916.

In 1906 Strunsky and her sister Rose went to Russia as correspondents for a revolutionary journal run by the wealthy American socialist William English Walling. She married him there, and they settled in New York City after returning to the United States. She lived there for the remainder of her life, continuing to write. She was active in socialist and progressive causes, maintaining opposition to war after the United States entered World War I. She worked to end war and capital punishment.

Early life and education
Anna Strunsky was born March 21, 1877, into a Jewish family in Babinots (now Babinovitch), Liozna Raion, Russian Empire (now Belarus). She and her parents, Elias Strunsky and Anna Horowitz, emigrated to New York City in 1886 when she was nine years old. Her several siblings included an older brother Max and a younger sister Rose, with whom she was close. After several years in New York, in 1893, the family moved to San Francisco. They moved in with her older brother Max, already established in the city as a doctor.

Anna joined the Socialist Labor Party as a teenager and remained a socialist the rest of her life. She studied at Stanford University (1896–1898). While at Stanford, she met the young writer Jack London, and they became close friends. She and London spent a great deal of time together discussing social and political issues.

Socialist and writer
Strunsky and her sister Rose, who also attended Stanford, became leading members of the turn-of-the-20th century San Francisco intellectual scene, part of a radical group of young Californian writers and artists known as "The Crowd." It included Jack London, Jim Whitaker, George Sterling, and others.

With Jack London, Strunsky wrote her first novel, The Kempton-Wace Letters, in the epistolary style. They published it anonymously in 1903. After his death in 1916, Strunsky published a memoir of her relationship with London.

In 1906 Strunsky and her sister Rose joined American socialist William English Walling in Russia as correspondents for his revolutionary news bureau. They were reporting on the failed revolution of 1905. He was an independently wealthy man from Kentucky who became a socialist and progressive. Anna and William married that year, returning to the United States at the end of the year. Based in New York City, they traveled and reported together on the Springfield race riot of 1908 in Illinois, and called for an effort in the North to deal with racial discrimination. They had four children together before separating about a decade later. Walling was among the co-founders of the National Association for the Advancement of Colored People (NAACP) in 1909, along with W. E. B. Du Bois and Mary Ovington.

Strunsky continued her writing while living in New York, and her second novel, Violette of Père Lachaise, was published in 1915. Around the same time, she and her husband moved to Greenwich, Connecticut and she joined the Woman's Peace Party. William and Anna separated during the Great War, in part due to their disagreement over the United States' role in the conflict; William supported US intervention as necessary to defeat the Central Powers and left the Socialist movement, which was anti-war.

Strunsky continued to write and advocate for socialism. She participated in Quaker social activity, and was an active member of several liberal-left groups, including the War Resisters League, the League for Mutual Aid, the American League to Abolish Capital Punishment, and the League for Industrial Democracy.

Strunsky died on February 25, 1964, in New York. She was survived by her four children, Rosamond, Anna, Georgia and Hayden Walling. Hayden, an architect known for his work on Cape Cod, died in 1981. Rosamond (1910-1999) became a painter who was married to Edward Corbett at the time of his death.

Legacy
Anna Strunsky Walling Papers are held by the Bancroft Library, University of California, Berkeley, the Yale University Library and the Huntington Library.

References

External links

 Anna Strunsky Walling papers (MS 1111). Manuscripts and Archives, Yale University Library. 
 
 

1877 births
1964 deaths
20th-century American novelists
20th-century American women writers
American socialists
American women novelists
Jewish socialists
Belarusian Jews
People from Liozna District
American people of Russian-Jewish descent
People from San Francisco
War Resisters League activists
Belarusian women writers
Novelists from California
20th-century Belarusian writers
Emigrants from the Russian Empire to the United States